The Orlando Thunder was a member of the World League of American Football from 1991 to 1992 (known as NFL Europe from 1995 onwards). The team played their games in the 70,000 seat Florida Citrus Bowl, and was coached by Don Matthews in 1991 and Galen Hall in 1992. The team's most visible point was their colors – the League wanted to develop new colors which hadn't been used for teams before, hence the vermilion and green that the Raleigh-Durham Skyhawks wore, and the fluorescent green jerseys that the Thunder sported.

The team's general managers were Lee Corso and Dick Beam. In 1991 the team played to a 5–5 record, and in 1992 the team had an outstanding 8–2 record, and made it to the World Bowl II championship game before losing to the Sacramento Surge 21–17.  The Thunder's attendance figures fell from over 19,000 per game in its first year to just over 16,000 per game in 1992.  The team folded after the 1992 season with the rest of the WLAF's North American operations. The league would later use the team's name (but not its colors or history) for the Berlin Thunder.

Notable players include Kerwin Bell and Scott Mitchell, a left-handed quarterback who went on to play in the NFL for the Miami Dolphins and Detroit Lions and Dan Sileo, who went on to become a famous sports talk radio host.

In 2006, readers of ESPN's Uni Watch column voted the team's jersey 2nd worst football jersey of all-time.

Season-by-season

1991 season

Personnel

Staff

Roster

Results

1992 season

Results

Staff

Roster

References

 
NFL Europe (WLAF) teams
Defunct American football teams in Florida
American football teams in Orlando, Florida
American football teams established in 1991
American football teams disestablished in 1992
1991 establishments in Florida
1992 disestablishments in Florida